Tony Papenfuss (born March 26, 1950 in Robbinsdale, Minnesota) is an American television and film actor.

Papenfuss is best known for his role as one of the brothers Darryl on Newhart. He was "my brother Darryl", the one with the straighter, darker hair. He reprised this role as a guest-star on an episode of Coach. Before his appearance on Newhart, he also had minor roles in Escape from New York and Firefox.

After Newhart, Papenfuss guest starred on many television shows, including Seinfeld, Star Trek: Deep Space Nine, Murphy Brown, Roswell, and Providence. He also appeared in several films, including How to Kill a Mockingbird, Factotum, and Sweet Land.

His most recent projects include The Completely Remarkable, Utterly Fabulous Transformation of a Regular Joe and Holiday Beach.

Of his role in Newhart, John Voldstad, who played the other brother who never talked, said he and Papenfuss came up with imaginary scripts that represented what the brothers were thinking. The casting director "knew we could look like we weren't just standing there. We could look like we had something going on in our minds."

After Newhart, Papenfuss toured with his co-stars William Sanderson and Voldstad. Voldstad also continues to act and appear at conventions; he and Papenfuss  attended Altoona Day in May 2014.  Voldstad said, "I talk to him pretty regularly. Me and Tony are like brothers."

Filmography

References

External links
 

1950 births
Living people
American male film actors
American male television actors
Male actors from Minneapolis
20th-century American male actors
21st-century American male actors